Janry du Toit (born 26 August 1996) is a Namibian rugby union player who generally plays as a centre represents Namibia internationally. He was included in the Namibian squad for the 2019 Rugby World Cup which is held in Japan for the first time and also marks his first World Cup appearance.

Career 
He made his international debut for Namibia against Russia on 10 November 2018.

References 

1996 births
Living people
Namibian rugby union players
Namibia international rugby union players
Rugby union centres
Peñarol Rugby players
Welwitschias players